Courdemanche may refer to the following communes in France:

Courdemanche, Eure, in the Eure département
Courdemanche, Sarthe, in the Sarthe département